Salem Chapel is in Vicarage Road, East Budleigh, Devon, England.  Initially a Presbyterian, then a Congregational chapel, it was later owned by the Assemblies of God, and is now owned by the Historic Chapels Trust.  The chapel, together with the adjacent assembly room and the boundary walls, is recorded in the National Heritage List for England as a designated Grade II* listed building. It is mentioned as the final two words of the short story, "Pomp and Vanities", written by S.Baring-Gould, circa 1865 and contained in his "Book of Ghost Stories", first published in 1903.  The final two words, Salem Chapel, are referenced as an example of everything "heaven is not"!

History

The chapel was built in 1719 and enlarged by the addition of further galleries in 1836.  In the 1980s it was bought by a private owner who failed to gain support for his plans.  The building then fell into disrepair.  The Historic Chapels Trust visited it in 1996 and acquired its ownership in 1998.  It cost £858,000 to restore the building, this being raised by grants from the Heritage Lottery Fund, English Heritage, East Devon District Council, and a variety of other sources.

It is reputed that during the 18th and 19th centuries the chapel was involved with smuggling, involving its minister Samuel Leat, the smuggled goods being concealed in the chapel's large roof space.

Architecture

The chapel is built in stone which has been rendered, and has a slate roof.  It is a square building with a vestry projecting at right angles from the rear of the right side.  The roof is hipped on all sides.  There are two doors in the entrance face which bears a limestone plaque inscribed "Salem chapel, built 1719" and a sill inscribed "enlarged 1836".  There are two windows on each side and another two windows on the back wall.  Internally, over the entrance is a gallery which was part of the original building, and on each side are galleries added in 1836.  In the centre of the original gallery is an 18th-century clock.  The preaching desk dates probably from the late 19th century as do the benches, and there are some 18th-century box pews in the galleries.  The ceiling is vaulted and is supported by a central steel post.  The former central post had been iron but this was replaced during the restoration.

The separate assembly room has a rectangular plan and under it is a basement.  On its long face is a door between two sash windows.  There is another sash window on the left end, and on the right end is a door leading to the basement.  The boundary wall is constructed in rubble and brick.  On the front wall are two gate piers between which are cast iron double gates and a wrought iron overthrow.  The overthrow is decorated with scrolls and at its top is a lamp holder.

Present day

Today, the chapel hosts a wide variety of events, including concerts, open days, and occasional services of worship. It is available to hire and is licensed for religious marriages. It may also be used for blessing ceremonies following civil marriages.

See also
List of chapels preserved by the Historic Chapels Trust

References

External links
Photographs following restoration

Grade II* listed churches in Devon
Religious buildings and structures completed in 1718
18th-century Presbyterian churches
Churches preserved by the Historic Chapels Trust
Presbyterian churches in England
18th-century churches in the United Kingdom
1718 establishments in England
East Devon District